Caraga Region is located at northeastern part of Mindanao.  It includes the five provinces of Dinagat Province, Surigao del Norte, Surigao del Sur, Agusan del Norte and Agusan del Sur.  Caraga Region is now hosting several mining projects producing various mineral commodities particularly but not limited to gold, copper, chrome, nickel, iron and limestone for concrete cement production.  This makes the Department of Environment and Natural Resources, Mines and Geosciences Bureau, Regional Office No. 13 with Office located in Surigao City plays important role in the region's economy, job generation, social and environmental enhancement and protection and ensuring government shares through royalties and taxes.

Caraga Region is one of the regions notably located in the eastern seaboard of the Philippines.  With its geographic location facing the Pacific Ocean and famous Philippine Trench, the Region is prone to various weather conditions and geologic phenomenon like, but not limited to,  typhoon, tsunami and other coastal surges and seismic activities.  With these, DENR-MGB13 is expeditiously utilizing its human and financial resources to generate geohazard maps as necessary source of information to spatial planners and other government and non-government agencies working for public safety and disaster management.

General geology 
In the broader physiographic framework of the Philippine archipelago, Caraga Region occupies the northernmost portion of the Eastern Mindanao Ridge or Mindanao Pacific Cordillera, a more than 400-km, NNW-SSE trending orogenic belt comprising eastern Mindanao.  The Mindanao Pacific Cordillera is bounded by two major structures that played a key role in the neotectonic evolution of the Philippine Mobile Belt, namely the Philippine Trench and the Philippine Fault Zone.

The geologic evolution of the Mindanao Pacific Cordillera was largely controlled by convergent and transcurrent tectonics intermittently active during Upper Cretaceous to Pleistocene times. These complex tectonic processes brought about the juxtaposition of older metamorphic basement rocks with ophiolite suite of rocks later superposed by younger multiple stage island arc volcano-sedimentary sequences. The broad geomorphic configuration of the region is largely controlled by these tectonic processes of the past.

Oldest rocks in the region are pre-Tertiary metamorphics and ophiolitic suite of rocks of Cretaceous age. Limited exposures of post-ophiolitic sedimentary rocks of Eocene age suggest dominant erosional processes from Paleocene to Eocene period. On the contrary, the Oligocene to Middle Miocene age is marked by thick accumulation of arc basaltic volcano-sedimentary sequence and turbidites later succeeded by mid-Miocene to Pliocene volcanic flows, pyroclastics and epiclastic of more andesitic composition. Arc magmatism was also active during the mid-Miocene to Pliocene times generating monzonitic and dioritic stocks and plutons and hornblende andesite porphyry intrusions. In areas away from paleo-volcanic centers, thick sedimentary clastic rocks with sporadic limestone horizons and intercalated calcareous sediments, marls and/or coal seams were formed during the Miocene to Pliocene. Reefal limestone, some of dubious stratigraphic position unconformably capped older rocks with age assignment ranging from Miocene to Plio-Pleistocene. The Paco-Maniayao volcanic complex north of Lake Mainit represents the latest Quaternary volcanism in the region.

Mineral resources 
The rich mineral heritage of Caraga Region greatly owes its genesis to these complex natural processes operative during a long span of geologic time. Two (2) major geological events are noteworthy in influencing the high mineral endowment of the Region. These are: 1) the emplacement of Upper Cretaceous ophiolites over the eastern Philippines proto-arc during the Paleocene times and 2) island arc calc-alkalic magmatic and volcanic activity during the Miocene to Pliocene times coeval with the inception of the Philippine Trench – Philippine Fault system resulting from the oblique convergence of the Philippine Sea Plate with eastern Mindanao.

The superposition of the younger island arc plutonic and sub-volcanic rocks with associated hydrothermal base and precious metal deposits with an older ophiolite suite of rocks with affiliated nickel and chromite deposits makes Caraga Region as one of the most prolifically endowed belt of the Philippines in terms of mineral resource potential and diversity.

Major metallic commodities

Ophiolite and associated nickel and chromite deposits

Caraga Region is situated in the Samar – Surigao segment of the Eastern Bicol – Eastern Mindanao ophiolite belt, one of the nine (9) major ophiolite. Ophiolites, particularly the ultramafic member of the assemblage, are of economic significance as they play host to two strategic ferro-alloy metallic commodities namely nickel and chromium. Large tracts of ultramafic terrains are exposed in the province of Surigao del Norte and northern Surigao del Sur, a majority of which are within the Surigao Mineral Reservation (SMR). Minor occurrences can also be found in the western range of Agusan del Norte.

The nickel resources of the region are in the form of nickeliferous laterites, soils of unique geochemistry derived from the tropical weathering of parent serpentinized ultramafites. Two types of nickel ore are of commercial importance, limonite (oxide) ore and saprolite (nickel silicate) ore. Nickel content is higher in the saprolite zone although cobalt is an important by-product of the limonite horizon.  Potential is high in Surigao del Norte and northern Surigao del Sur particularly in Dinagat and Nonoc group of islands as well as in Claver – Carrascal area, Surigao mainland. Potential, but of lower tonnage occur in the western highlands of Agusan del Norte particularly from Jabonga to Tubay area.

Chromite deposits of typical metallurgical grade are also widely distributed in the ultramafic rocks and are of two types namely primary and secondary chromites, also known in simple parlance as lumpy and sandy chromite, respectively. Primary or orthomagmatic chromites are sporadically distributed in the ultramafics although major economic deposits are generally concentrated in the transition zone between residual harzburgite and cumulate dunite unit. Secondary chromite are either concentrated as residual deposits in latosols or as alluvial deposits in streams and coastal beaches. Large potential of chromite deposits occur in Dinagat Island, Surigao del Norte while sporadic occurrences are also present in the Claver-Carrascal area, Surigao mainland.

Island arc volcanism and associated hydrothermal copper and gold deposits

Caraga Region likewise occupies the northern and central part of the Eastern Mindanao Gold District, one of the principal gold belts of the country.  The province is traditionally known for its productive epithermal to mesothermal gold ± silver deposits even during the pre-WWII times and has been a prime producer of the royal metal during the last two decades. Gold mineralization is generally associated with Miocene to Pliocene plutonic and volcanic rocks of calc-alkalic affinity.

The discovery of the Boyongan porphyry copper deposit further enhance the mineral prospectivity of the region in targeting additional concealed copper ± gold deposits beneath or adjacent to known upper-level hydrothermal gold systems. The recognition of presence of telescoped epithermal—hypothermal deposit pairs offers a new dimension in copper—gold exploration for the Region.

In terms of potential for gold, Surigao del Norte still ranks high followed by Agusan del Sur and Agusan del Norte. For porphyry copper, rank is still the same although Agusan del Norte have a slight edge than Agusan del Sur as low-level diorite is already exposed in the Asiga area. At present, Surigao del Sur relatively ranks as lowest in potential for both epithermal gold and porphyry copper prospects among the provinces of the Region although its prospectivity may improve as exploration work progresses in the future.

Minor metallic mineral commodities

Manganese

Geologically, manganese prospects in the region are typically associated with basaltic rocks. Numerous, although sporadic occurrences are reported in the basalts in Surigao del Sur as well as in basalt – limestone contact in RTR town, Agusan del Norte. Continuity is less established and is deemed amenable at present to small scale mining.

Bauxite

Aluminous bauxite deposit had been reported in Bucas Grande Island, Surigao del Norte but at present, the island is declared as a protected area under the NIPA's domain.

Magnetite

Two types of magnetite deposits are found in the region. Primary magnetite in the form of skarn deposit has been reported in Jubgan, San Francisco, Surigao del Norte hosted in ultramafic rocks intruded by felsic intrusives. Secondary titaniferous magnetite sands are reported in the coastal beaches of Bacuag-Gigaquit-Claver area, Surigao del Norte mainland. Of still unresolved genesis are the recently discovered magnetite bodies overlying ultramafic rocks in Urbiztondo, Claver, Surigao del Norte adjacent to ultramafic terrain – arc basalt / limestone lithology.

Non-metallic commodities

Limestone and Guano

Limestone exposures of varying age are widespread in the Region. Application broadly differs with age. The only cement plant in the Region located in Surigao City derived its raw materials from limestone of Mio-Pliocene age. Industrial and agri-lime are mostly derived from younger limestone bodies (Plio-Pleistocene age). Slightly metamorphosed / marbelized limestone of Oligo-Miocene and pre-Tertiary age are potential for dimension and ornamental stones but production is locally limited and largely untapped.

Numerous caves developed in limestone terrains had been inventoried in the past for presence of phosphate – guano deposits. However, with the current thrust on prioritization of cave for protection and use as eco-tourism spots, extraction of guanos from caves is currently minimal.

Silica

High grade silica bodies (90% and above) amenable to small-scale mining occur in Dinagat Island associated with Cretaceous metamorphics. Lower grade local silica source for cement additive is derived from plagiophyric andesite porphyry in Surigao City.

Dimension Stones

Serpentinized ultramafics form the bulk of materials that are utilized as dimension/ornamental stones. Presently, raw source from Dinagat are being shipped to Cebu, where they are further polished and formed into finished products. Other sources are from foliated—schistosed metamorphics primarily used as local landscape materials. Overall, utilization of rocks with ornamental properties as well as semi-precious gemstone gatherings remain an undeveloped industry in the Region.

Coal

Although several coal seams had been reported in the literature, those of viable quality are found mostly in Surigao del Sur particularly in the Bislig-Lingig coal district and in San Miguel town.

Water resources 

Based on the rapid appraisal of water supply sources covering Caraga Region, existing water resources can be broadly categorized into three types namely; groundwater, springs and surface waters.

Groundwater

In terms of groundwater availability, the percentage per province in terms of area per category are as follows:

The extent of completely shallow well area is limited, because most of the recent sedimentary deposits are thick or deposited on younger, permeable rocks that usually have multiple aquifers at greater depths.

Surface Waters

Major surface water sources in Agusan del Norte are Agusan River, Cabadbaran River, Kalinawan River, Linugos River, Tubay River and Lake Mainit. About 99.5% of the surface water rights were registered for irrigation

Major surface water sources in the province are the Agusan River and its tributaries. Surface water use is however mainly for irrigation purposes.

Major surface water sources in the province of Surigao del Norte are the Surigao River, Valencia River, Mayag River, Sonkoy Creek, Bacuag River and Gigaguit River. About 94% of the surface water rights were registered for irrigation and the remaining 6% were for domestic, industrial and fisheries by water supply systems and a few private companies. For domestic water supply, the Surigao Metropolitan Water District (SMWD) has registered water from the Parang-Parang Creek (tributary of the Surigao River) since 1994. Actually, SMWD has been collecting surface water from protected spring fields. 
 
Major surface water sources in the province of Surigao del Sur are the Carac-an River, Tago River and Bislig River. The bulk of surface water rights were registered for irrigation and the remaining were for domestic, industrial and fisheries by water supply systems and a few private companies.

Springs

Developed spring sources are usually exploited in hilly to mountainous areas generally classified as difficult areas for groundwater development. Springs are generally localized in occurrence and emanate along contact between pervious and massive rocks; faults, joints, sheared zones and other rock discontinuities; and enlarged solution cavities in limestone / karstic terrain. Higher yield spring waters usually occur in areas underlain by limestone.
Developed spring sources inventoried and identified untapped but with potential for future development per province are as follows:

	
No detailed spring sources inventory had been undertaken so far for the province of Surigao del Sur.

Officers

Sources 

Department of Environment and Natural Resources (Philippines)